Philip Carteret was a naval officer.

Philip Carteret may also refer to:

Philip Carteret (colonial governor) (1639–1682), first Governor of New Jersey
Sir Philip Carteret, 1st Baronet (1620–?), 4th Seigneur of Sark
Sir Philip Carteret, 2nd Baronet (c. 1650–1693), 5th Seigneur of Sark
Philip Carteret FRS (1641–1672), son of Sir George Carteret

See also
Carteret (disambiguation)